The office of high sheriff, as the monarch's representative in a county, is over 1,000 years old, with its establishment before the Norman Conquest. The office of high sheriff remained first in precedence in each county until the reign of Edward VII when an Order in Council in 1908 gave the lord-lieutenant the prime office under the Crown as the sovereign's personal representative. The high sheriff remains the sovereign's representative in the county for all matters relating to the judiciary and the maintenance of law and order.

The office of High Sheriff of Greater London was created in 1965 and covers the ceremonial county of Greater London. It does not cover the City of London, which has its own two sheriffs. It replaced the offices of High Sheriff of the County of London and High Sheriff of Middlesex which were abolished in 1965.

Coat of arms
The office of Sheriff of Greater London was granted armorial bearings by letters patent issued by the College of Arms dated 5 December 1966. The blazon of the arms is:

The seaxes or short notched swords came from the arms of Essex and Middlesex, the Saxon crown from those of Middlesex and the white horse from those of Kent.

Officeholders

References

External links

 
London, Greater
Local government in London
History of London
High Sheriff of Greater London